Gregory Townsend Sr. (born November 3, 1961) is a former American football defensive end in the National Football League (NFL). He was drafted by the Los Angeles Raiders in the fourth round of the 1983 NFL Draft. Townsend also played for the Philadelphia Eagles.

Career

College career
He played college football at Texas Christian.

Professional career

Los Angeles Raiders
Townsend was drafted by the Los Angeles Raiders in the fourth round of the 1983 NFL Draft. He was selected to 2 Pro Bowls, and he was a 4-time All-Pro selection. He won a Super Bowl ring with the Raiders in 1984. Townsend was suspended twice during his time with the Raiders. Once for his participation in a brawl versus the Kansas City Chiefs on October 5, 1986, and another for being caught with marijuana in 1988.

Philadelphia Eagles
In 1994, he signed with the Eagles.  He recorded 2 sacks during his lone season in Philadelphia.

Oakland Raiders
In 1997, he returned to the Raiders and played for the team that drafted him.

Legacy
Townsend is currently 24th on the NFL's all-time list for career sacks with 109.5.  He is also the Raider's all-time sack leader.   He also recovered 8 fumbles and returned three of them for touchdowns.

Personal
His son, Greg Townsend, Jr., played defensive end at USC. and was signed as an undrafted free agent with Oakland Raiders.

In 2012, Townsend partnered with Celebrity Publishing to release his memoir entitled "All Time."

References

1961 births
Living people
American football defensive ends
American football linebackers
American football defensive tackles
TCU Horned Frogs football players
Los Angeles Raiders players
Philadelphia Eagles players
Oakland Raiders players
American Conference Pro Bowl players
Players of American football from Los Angeles
Players of American football from Compton, California
100 Sacks Club